The Wide Bay Highway is a short state highway of Queensland, Australia running between Goomeri on the Burnett Highway and a junction on the Bruce Highway.  From the junction it is 12 kilometres south to Gympie or 69 kilometres north to Maryborough. The length of the highway is 63 kilometres.

At its western end the road continues from Goomeri as the Bunya Highway, connecting it to Dalby.

List of towns along the Wide Bay Highway
 Goomeri
 Kilkivan
 Woolooga

Major intersections

See also

 Highways in Australia
 List of highways in Queensland

References

Highways in Queensland
Wide Bay–Burnett